Kedar Nath Singh is an Indian politician, currently a member of Rashtriya Janata Dal and three time consecutive Member of Legislative Assembly (India) from Baniapur (Vidhan Sabha constituency). He is the brother of former Member of Parliament, Prabhunath Singh.

He has a few criminal charges against him, in one of them recently a charge sheet was filed against him.

References 

Living people
1969 births
Bihar MLAs 2020–2025
Rashtriya Janata Dal politicians
Bihar MLAs 2010–2015
Bihar MLAs 2015–2020